AARC may refer to:

Ad Astra Rocket Company
Ak-Sar-Ben Amateur Radio Club
Alberta Adolescent Recovery Centre
Alliance of Artists and Recording Companies
American Association for Respiratory Care
Aruba Amateur Radio Club
AustralAsia Rail Corporation
Authentication and Authorisation for Research and Collaboration Project